Monster Munch is a baked crisp snack made by Walkers, and formerly by Smiths.

Monster Munch may also refer to
 Mighty Munch, a corn snack made by Tayto, formerly known as "Monster Munch"
 Monster Munch (France), a potato snack sold in France by Intersnack under the Vico brand
 Monster Munch (video game), a Pac-Man style video game for the Commodore 64

See also
 Monster Munchies, a British cookery television show